Virgula (Latin for "twig") may refer to:
 dowsing rod or divining rod
 sicula, the central rod of a graptolite
 spines of a ray
 stem (music), the tail of a musical note
 Virgula, a formerly recognized genus of moths now treated as Dichomeris

See also
 Virgule (disambiguation), various medieval and literary punctuation marks